Eight ships of the French Navy have borne the name Guêpe ("wasp"):

Ships named Guêpe 
 , a 10-gun cutter captured from the British 
 , a 3-gun gunboat, bore the name Guêpe during her career. 
 , a 16-gun brig 
 , a gunboat, bore the name Guêpe during her career.  
 , a defence submarine, lead ship of her class. 
 , a patrol boat 
 , an auxiliary minelaying ship, seized from a German company 
 , a high sea tug

See also

Notes and references
Notes

References

Bibliography
 
 

French Navy ship names